Latvijas Avīze ('Latvian Newspaper') was a daily newspaper published from Liepāja, Latvia in 1919. It was set up by followers of Andrievs Niedra following the 16 April 1919 putsch. The first issue came out on 24 April 1919. The newspaper was edited by V. Zariņš and E. Kadeģis.

The newspaper became short-lived, as the Niedra cabinet fell in late June 1919.

References

Publications established in 1919
Publications disestablished in 1919
Newspapers published in Latvia
Latvian-language newspapers